Francisco Pérez Bayer (1711–1794) was a Spanish philologist, jurist and writer.

Works
Catalog of the Royal Library of El Escorial. Damaiuis et Laurentius Hispani, Rome, 1756.
Alphabet and language of the Phoenicians and their colonies, 1772.
Travel literature. Valencia: Institution Alfonso the Magnanimous, 1998.
Etymology of the Spanish language.
Archeological journey from Valencia to Andalusia and Portugal.
De Numis Hebraeo-Samaritanis, 1781
From Temple Hebraeorum Toletano
Institutions of the Hebrew language.
Origin of Spanish voices derived from Hebrew.

People from Valencia
Writers from the Valencian Community
Spanish numismatists
18th-century Latin-language writers
1711 births
1794 deaths
University of Salamanca alumni
Academic staff of the University of Salamanca